(French) or  (Dutch), meaning "The Wheel", is a district of Anderlecht, a municipality of Brussels, Belgium. Located in the south of Anderlecht, it is one of this municipality's largest districts of and one of Brussels' main garden cities. Built in the 1920s, with its modest and picturesque houses, it offers a great vision of an early 20th century working class neighbourhood. It is also home to one of the largest agribusiness industry campuses in Belgium; the Food and Chemical Industries Education and Research Center (CERIA/COOVI), as well as popular department stores.

The district is crossed by the last end of the / in Brussels, and is bounded to the east by the Brussels–Charleroi Canal and to the south by the Flemish municipality of Sint-Pieters-Leeuw, in the Pajottenland. It is served by the metro stations Bizet, La Roue/Het Rad and CERIA/COOVI on line 5.

Sights
 The Church of St. Joseph, an Art Deco Roman Catholic church built in 1938–39
 The Food and Chemical Industries Education and Research Center (CERIA/COOVI)
 The headquarters of Coca-Cola Belgium and Luxembourg, at 1424, /

References

Notes

External links

 La Roue — quartier historique, a unique document about La Roue/Het Rad by Florent Van Hoey, November 1984  (PDF)

Neighbourhoods of Brussels
Anderlecht